Galina Aleksandrovna Leontyeva (6 November 1941 – 4 February 2016) was a Russian volleyball player who represented the USSR at the Olympics.

References

External links
  
 

1941 births
2016 deaths
People from Danilovsky District, Yaroslavl Oblast
Soviet women's volleyball players
Olympic volleyball players of the Soviet Union
Volleyball players at the 1968 Summer Olympics
Volleyball players at the 1972 Summer Olympics
Olympic gold medalists for the Soviet Union
Olympic medalists in volleyball
Honoured Masters of Sport of the USSR
Medalists at the 1972 Summer Olympics
Medalists at the 1968 Summer Olympics